Tallahattah Creek is a stream in the U.S. state of Mississippi.

Tallahattah is a name derived from the Choctaw language meaning "white rock". Variant names are "Tali Hata Creek" and "Tallahatta Creek".

References

Rivers of Mississippi
Rivers of Jasper County, Mississippi
Mississippi placenames of Native American origin